Miklós Sebők (1923-1986), was a former male international table tennis player from Hungary.

He won a silver medal at the 1953 World Table Tennis Championships in the Swaythling Cup (men's team event) with Elemér Gyetvai, József Kóczián, Ferenc Sidó and Kálmán Szepesi.

See also
 List of table tennis players
 List of World Table Tennis Championships medalists

References

Hungarian male table tennis players
1923 births
1986 deaths
World Table Tennis Championships medalists
Table tennis players from Budapest
20th-century Hungarian people